Fath Mashhad Football Club, commonly known as Fath Mashhad, or FTH, is an Iranian football club based in Mashhad, Khorasan, that competes in the League 2. The club was founded in 1988.

The football team plays their home games at the Takhti Stadium which has a seating capacity of 15,000. The club is owned and supported by the Hamid Vahidi.

The club is for youth and junior leagues with the goal of improving football players and to introduce them to pro leagues of Iran, in this case, Fath football club transfers good football players to the pro leagues such as Behtash Misahian, Siavash Yazdani, Vahid Agari, etc.

History

Establishment
In 1988, a group of youngsters, who were from Mashhad along with Hamid Vahidi, established a football team named Fath. They started playing in the 2nd division of Mashhad's local city league. The club was officially founded on 11 February 1988, the day of the Islamic Revolution. Since then it is possible for young players to improve their ability while playing for Fath Mashhad.

1990s
In 1995 they became champions of Khorasan province, and in 1996 were promoted to the League 2.

Takeover

Fath Mashhad are now officially known as Fath Mashhad, although the name is not in common use yet. Hamid Vahidi is the club's chairman since the establishment of the club in 1988.

They kept the coach Hamid Vahidi till end where he was appointed as Iran's Futsal team head coach and had to leave the club, so Haj Kazem left the club after 10 years being in charge and he finished his last season in mid table and was replaced by Hamid Vahidi.

Mashhad Derby
Main articles: Mashhad Derby
The Mashhad Derby is played between Fath Mashhad and Aboumoslem, but due to relegation to the Azadegan League and then the 2nd Division, the derby has not been played in over 5 years.

Players
As of July 23, 2003

First-team squad

 (3rd captain)

 (captain)

 (vice captain)

Head coaches
 Hamid Vahidi (1988-)

References

 https://www.youtube.com/watch?v=ydACi1Y_Ks
 http://video.varzesh3.com/iran/premier-league/%D9%81%D8%AC%8%B1-%D8%B3%D9%BE%D8%A7%D8%B3%DB%8C1-1%D9%BE%D8%B1%D8%B3%D9%BE%D9%88%D9%84%DB%8C%D8%B3/
 http://video.varzesh3.com/iran/premier-league/%D9%BE%D8%B1%8%B3%D9%BE%D9%88%D9%84%DB%8C%D8%B3-2-3-%D9%81%D8%AC%D8%B1-%D8%B3%D9%BE%D8%A7%D8%B3%DB%8C/

External links
 Official club website

Football clubs in Iran
Association football clubs established in 1988
Sport in Mashhad
1988 establishments in Iran